Taieri College, formerly called The Taieri High School and, prior to 1956, the Mosgiel District High School, is a co-educational state school in Mosgiel, Dunedin, New Zealand.

In 2003 a review of the schools on the Taieri Plains by the New Zealand Ministry of Education proposed that the high school would merge with Mosgiel Intermediate School (est. 1973) to become Taieri College from 2004. Because of this merger, ready-made classrooms were built for the intermediate students, as well as a second technology block. The roll expanded to over 800 in its first year, compared with the former high school's number of under 650 students, and now has 1090 students in 2018.

Classrooms
In 2005 it was announced that more classrooms were to be built as well as refurbishment of present classroom blocks. In 2006 the roll exceeded 1000, making it one of Otago's largest schools. Zoning has been proposed to cap or maintain future numbers, as classroom space is becoming limited, even though a new two-storey classroom block, G block, has been completed.

Notable alumni

Geoff Bascand – Deputy Governor and Head of Operations at the Reserve Bank of NZ 2013
Ian Foster – Assistant All Black Coach World Cup Winner 2015. All Black Head Coach Dec 2019
Adam Hall (alpine skier) – Winter Paralympic gold medalist 2010, 2018
Steve Hansen (KNZM) – All Black Head Coach 2012 – 2019  World Cup Winner 2015
David Hunter – Played sixteen first class matches for Otago Cricket Team. Appointed Principal of Taieri College 2013
Colin James – political journalist
Peter Johnstone – All Black, 1949 -51. Undefeated as NZ Captain. Taieri Club ground is named after him
Michael McGarry – All White. Capped 54 times. 12 Goals. 1986 – 1997
Alan Mark – professor at Otago University (botany) and environmentalist
Barry Milburn – NZ Test cricket wicketkeeper in 1969
Dean O'Brien aka "Mr Yipadee" – Children's entertainer, author and musician
Bob Reid – Drummer with band, The Knobz
Janine Southby (nee Brown) – Former head coach of the Silver Ferns, New Zealand's national netball team

References

Secondary schools in Dunedin
Mosgiel